The Philadelphia Wings are a lacrosse team based in Philadelphia playing in the National Lacrosse League (NLL). The 2011 season was the 25th in franchise history. 2011 was another frustrating season for the Wings as they finished 5-11 and out of the playoffs for the eighth time in the last nine seasons.

Regular season

Conference standings

Game log
Reference:

Roster

See also
2011 NLL season

References

Philadelphia Wings seasons
2011 in lacrosse
Phil